Žehňa is a village and municipality in Prešov District in the Prešov Region of eastern Slovakia.

History
In historical records the village was first mentioned in 1330.

Geography
The municipality lies at an altitude of 415 metres and covers an area of  (2020-06-30/-07-01).

Population 
It has a population of 1,289 people (2020-12-31).

References 

Villages and municipalities in Prešov District
Šariš